The Congressman Lester Wolff Oyster Bay National Wildlife Refuge formerly known as the Oyster Bay National Wildlife Refuge on the north shore of Long Island consists of high quality marine habitats that support a variety of aquatic-dependent wildlife. The refuge's waters and marshes surround Sagamore Hill National Historic Site, home of Theodore Roosevelt - father of the National Wildlife Refuge System. Subtidal (underwater up to mean high tide line) habitats are abundant with marine invertebrates, shellfish and fish.

Marine invertebrate and fish communities support a complex food web from waterfowl to fish-eating birds, to marine mammals. Waterfowl use of the Refuge peaks from October through April. Over 20,000 ducks have been documented on the refuge during one survey. Over 25 species of waterfowl, along with numerous other waterbirds, depend on Oyster Bay for survival. The most common marine mammals at the refuge are harbor seals - which have become more noticeable during recent years. Sea turtles and diamondback terrapins can also be sighted at the Refuge.

References
Refuge website

National Wildlife Refuges in New York (state)
Oyster Bay (town), New York
Protected areas of Nassau County, New York
Wetlands of New York (state)
Landforms of Nassau County, New York
1968 establishments in New York (state)
Protected areas established in 1968